UCS may refer to:

Educational institutions
 University College School, a British independent school situated in Hampstead, north west London
 University Campus Suffolk, former name of a university based in Ipswich, Suffolk, United Kingdom
 University of Caxias do Sul, a university in Brazil

Technology
 Cisco Unified Computing System, a computing server product line
 Uniform Communication Standard, an electronic commerce standard
 Uniform-cost search, an algorithm used to search a weighted graph
 Univention Corporate Server, an operating and management system for IT infrastructure
 Universal Character Set, a standard for character encoding
 Universal Character Set feature for impact printers
 Universal Charging Solution, a proposed standard for cell phone chargers
 Uniform color space, a type of mathematical color model

Other
 Civic Solidarity Union, a political party in Bolivia
 Uniform Color Scales, a color space developed by the Optical Society of America
 Union of Concerned Scientists, a nonprofit advocacy organisation
 United Cigar Stores, an American tobacconist chain of the early 20th century
 United Communication Service, the largest cable operator in Bangladesh
 Universal Cartoon Studios, the animation and features division of Universal Studios
 Upper Clyde Shipbuilders, a now defunct amalgamation of shipbuilders of the River Clyde, Glasgow, Scotland
 Judiciary of New York or Unified Court System, of the State of New York
 Ultimate Collectors Series, a section of the Lego Star Wars range